InternetNZ (officially Internet New Zealand Inc., formerly the Internet Society of New Zealand) is a not-for-profit open membership organisation and the designated manager for the .nz country code top-level internet domain. It also supports the development of New Zealand's internet through policy, community grants, research, and events.

About 
As the designated manager for the .nz top level internet domain, InternetNZ represents New Zealand at a global level. It supports the development of New Zealand's internet through policy, grants and loans to individuals and organisations, research, and events. Part of the work of InternetNZ is advocacy and commentary. It makes submissions to New Zealand Select Committees, and in 2020 commented on the legislative process of the Films, Videos, and Publications Classification (Urgent Interim Classification of Publications and Prevention of Online Harm) Amendment Bill, which is an update to a 1993 Act.

Organisational structure 

The full name of InternetNZ is Internet New Zealand Incorporated and it is a registered incorporated society in New Zealand. It is a non-profit society with charitable status and is overseen by a council. It has a subsidiary organisation, the Domain Name Commission Ltd (DNCL). The Domain Name Commission supports the work of InternetNZ including administering an independent dispute resolution service.

Council 
The InternetNZ Council is the governing body for InternetNZ. It is made of nine members elected by the membership and two appointed members.

Council members 
The elected InternetNZ council as at 29 June 2022 are Joy Liddicoat (President since 2021), Jay Daley (Vice President since 2021), Sarah Lee, Kate Pearce, Richard Hulse, Don Stokes, Anthony Bow, Jeff Montgomery, Potaua Biasiny-Tule.

Chief Executive 
 Andrew Cushen, interim Chief Executive (2022–)
 Jordan Carter (2013–2022)
Vikram Kumar (2010–2013)

History 
The Internet Society of New Zealand was originally formed in 1995 to take responsibility for the .nz country code top-level domain. In 2006 the Internet Society of New Zealand joined the Internet Society as an organisational member. Despite sharing many aims with the Internet Society, InternetNZ is not a chapter of the Internet Society. On the 31 October 2007 InternetNZ formalised its relationship with the Internet Corporation for Assigned Names and Numbers (ICANN). In doing so ICANN recognised InternetNZ as the country code top level domain manager for .nz.  In April 2008, The Internet Society of New Zealand formally changed its official name to Internet New Zealand Inc.

InternetNZ Fellows 
InternetNZ periodically confers the InternetNZ Fellowship award on people who make ‘an outstanding contribution to the development of the internet in New Zealand’.

Events

NetHui conference 
Since 2011 InternetNZ has organised NetHui conferences around New Zealand encouraging New Zealanders to meet and discuss the benefits and issues of the internet.

Further reading 

 Connecting the Clouds - the Internet in New Zealand (2008), A history of the Internet in New Zealand, written by Keith Newman
Internet New Zealand (2008), InternetNZ briefing to incoming ministers.

See also 

 Domainz

References

External links 
 Official website
Sami, Madeleine (2010), Down to the wire : the story of New Zealand's internet. 

Internet governance organizations
Internet in New Zealand
Business organisations based in New Zealand